Gyuu is the first studio album by Masami Okui, released on April 21, 1995.

Information
 Includes a self-cover of the first song that Masami Okui composed and wrote the lyrics herself .

Track listing
Reincarnation
 OVA Tekkaman Blade II opening song
 Lyrics: Satomi Arimori
 Composition: Takashi Kudo
 Arrangement: Toshiro Yabuki

 Cover of Mariko Koda's character song in OVA Tekkaman Blade II
 Lyrics, composition: Masami Okui
 Arrangement: Toshiro Yabuki
I Was Born to Fall In Love
 OVA Compiler opening song
 Lyrics: Satomi Arimori
 Composition, arrangement: Hideya Nakazaki

 OVA Tekkaman Blade II image song
 Lyrics: Satomi Arimori
 Composition: Takashi Kudo
 Arrangement: Masami Okui
Full Up Mind
 OVA Compiler ending song
 Lyrics: Satomi Arimori
 Composition, arrangement: Hideya Nakazaki
Beats the Band
 Anime film Ghost Sweeper Mikami soundtrack
 Lyrics: Mamie D. Lee
 Composition: Makoto Ikenaga
 Arrangement: Vink
Face
 Cover for Saeko Shimazu's character song in OVA All Purpose Cultural Cat Girl Nuku Nuku
 Lyrics: Satomi Arimori
 Composition, arrangement: Tsutomu Ohira

 Original song Okui made specially for this album
 Lyrics, composition: Masami Okui
 Arrangement: Toshiro Yabuki
My Jolly Days
 Anime film Ghost Sweeper Mikami ending song
 Lyrics: Keiko Kimoto
 Composition: Tsutomu Ohira
 Arrangement: Vink

 OVA Tekkaman Blade II ending song
 Lyrics: Satomi Arimori
 Composition: Takashi Kudo
 Arrangement: Toshiro Yabuki
Energy
 OVA Megami Paradise image song
 Lyrics, composition: Masami Okui
 Arrangement: Toshiro Yabuki

 OVA Tekkaman Blade II ending song
 Lyrics: Satomi Arimori
 Composition: Takashi Kudo
 Arrangement: Toshiro Yabuki

 OVA Girl from Fantasia theme song
 Lyrics: Satomi Arimori
 Composition, arrangement: Toshiyuki Watanabe
Bay side love story -from tokyo-
 Lyrics, composition: Masami Okui
 Arrangement: Toshiro Yabuki, Tsutomu Ohira
 TV anime Neon Genesis Evangelion (anime) insert song

Sources
Official website: Makusonia

1995 debut albums
Masami Okui albums